Parapolydora gerrardii is a species of flowering plant in the family Asteraceae. It is native to South Africa.

References

Vernonieae
Flora of South Africa